Bill Bridges was an American football offensive guard who was a member of the 1969 College Football All-America Team while playing at the University of Houston. He was drafted in the 9th round, 213th overall, in the 1970 NFL Draft by the Buffalo Bills, but never played in a National Football League regular season game.

References

Living people
American football offensive guards
Houston Cougars football players
Year of birth missing (living people)